The history of chess can be traced back nearly 1500 years to its earliest known predecessor, called chaturanga, in India; its prehistory is the subject of speculation. From India it spread to Persia. Following the Arab invasion and conquest of Persia, chess was taken up by the Muslim world and subsequently spread to Europe via Spain (Al Andalus) and Italy (Emirate of Sicily). The game evolved roughly into its current form by about 1500 CE.

"Romantic chess" was the predominant playing style from the late 18th century to the 1880s. Chess games of this period emphasized quick, tactical maneuvers rather than long-term strategic planning. The Romantic era of play was followed by the Scientific, Hypermodern, and New Dynamism eras. In the second half of the 19th century, modern chess tournament play began, and the first official World Chess Championship was held in 1886. The 20th century saw great leaps forward in chess theory and the establishment of the World Chess Federation. In 1997, an IBM supercomputer beat Garry Kasparov, the then world chess champion, in the famous Deep Blue versus Garry Kasparov match, ushering the game into an era of computer domination. Since then, computer analysis – which originated in the 1970s with the first programmed chess games on the market – has contributed to much of the development in chess theory and has become an important part of preparation in professional human chess. Later developments in the 21st century made the use of computer analysis far surpassing the ability of any human player accessible to the public. Online chess, which first appeared in the mid-1990s, also became popular in the 21st century.

Origin 

Precursors to chess originated in India. There, its early form in the 7th century CE was known as chaturaṅga, which translates to "four divisions (of the military)": infantry, cavalry, elephantry, and chariotry. These forms are represented by the pieces that would evolve into the modern pawn, knight, bishop, and rook, respectively.

Chess was introduced to Persia from India and became a part of the princely or courtly education of Persian nobility. Around 600 CE in Sassanid Persia, the name for the game became chatrang, which subsequently evolved to shatranj after the conquest of Persia by the Rashidun Caliphate, due to the lack of native ch and ng sounds in the Arabic language. The rules were developed further during this time; players started calling "Shāh!" (Persian for "King!") when attacking the opponent's king, and "Shāh Māt!" (Persian for "the king is helpless" – see checkmate) when the king was attacked and could not escape from attack. These exclamations persisted in chess as it traveled to other lands.

The game was taken up by the Muslim world after the early Arab Muslims conquered the Sassanid Empire, with the pieces largely keeping their Persian names.
 From the exclamation "check" or "checkmate" as it was pronounced in various languages.
 From the first chessmen known of in Western Europe (except Iberia and Greece) being ornamental chess kings brought in as curios by Muslim traders.

The Mongols call the game shatar, and in Ethiopia it is called senterej, both evidently derived from shatranj.

Chess spread directly from the Middle East to Russia, where chess became known as шахматы (literally "checkmates", a plurale tantum).

The game reached Western Europe and Russia by at least three routes, the earliest being in the 9th century. By the year 1000 it had spread throughout Europe. Introduced into the Iberian Peninsula by the Moors in the 10th century, it was described in a famous 13th-century Spanish manuscript covering shatranj, backgammon and dice named the Libro de los juegos, which is the earliest European treatise on chess as well as being the oldest document on European tables games.

Chess spread throughout the world and many variants of the game soon began taking shape. Buddhist pilgrims, Silk Road traders and others carried it to the Far East where it was transformed and assimilated into a game often played on the intersection of the lines of the board rather than within the squares. Chaturanga reached Europe through Persia, the Byzantine empire and the expanding Arabian empire. Muslims carried chess to North Africa, Sicily, and Iberia by the 10th century.

The game was developed extensively in Europe.  By the late 15th century, it had survived a series of prohibitions and Christian Church sanctions to almost take the shape of the modern game. Modern history saw reliable reference works, competitive chess tournaments, and exciting new variants.  These factors added to the game's popularity, further bolstered by reliable timing mechanisms (first introduced in 1861), effective rules, and charismatic players.

India 

The earliest precursor of modern chess is a game called chaturanga, which flourished in India by the 6th century, and is the earliest known game to have two essential features found in all later chess variations—different pieces having different powers (which was not the case with checkers and Go), and victory depending on the fate of one piece, the king of modern chess. A common theory is that India's development of the board, and chess, was likely due to India's mathematical enlightenment involving the creation of the number zero. Other game pieces (speculatively called "chess pieces") uncovered in archaeological findings are considered as coming from other, distantly related board games, which may have had boards of 100 squares or more.

Chess was designed for an ashtāpada (Sanskrit for "having eight feet", i.e. an 8×8 squared board), which may have been used earlier for a backgammon-type race game (perhaps related to a dice-driven race game still played in south India where the track starts at the middle of a side and spirals into the center). Ashtāpada, the uncheckered 8×8 board served as the main board for playing chaturanga. Other Indian boards included the 10×10 Dasapada and the 9×9 Saturankam. Traditional Indian chessboards often have X markings on some or all of squares a1 a4 a5 a8 d1 d4 d5 d8 e1 e4 e5 e8 h1 h4 h5 h8: these may have been "safe squares" where capturing was not allowed in a dice-driven backgammon-type race game played on the ashtāpada before chess was invented.

The Cox-Forbes theory, proposed in the late 18th century by Hiram Cox, and later developed by Duncan Forbes, asserted that the four-handed game chaturaji was the original form of chaturanga.  The theory is no longer considered tenable.

In Sanskrit, the word chaturaṅga literally means "having four limbs (or parts)" and in epic poetry often means "army" (the four parts are elephants, chariots, horsemen, foot soldiers). The name came from a battle formation mentioned in the Indian epic Mahabharata. The game chaturanga was a battle-simulation game which rendered Indian military strategy of the time.

Some people formerly played chess using a die to decide which piece to move. There was an unproven theory that chess started as this dice-chess and that the gambling and dice aspects of the game were removed because of Hindu religious objections.

Scholars in areas to which the game subsequently spread, for example the Arab Abu al-Hasan 'Alī al-Mas'ūdī, detailed the Indian use of chess as a tool for military strategy, mathematics, gambling and even its vague association with astronomy. Mas'ūdī notes that ivory in India was chiefly used for the production of chess and backgammon pieces, and asserts that the game was introduced to Persia from India, along with the book Kelileh va Demneh, during the reign of emperor Nushirwan.

In some variants, a win was by checkmate, or by stalemate, or by "bare king" (taking all of an opponent's pieces except the king).

In some parts of India the pieces in the places of the rook, knight and bishop were renamed by words meaning (in this order) Boat, Horse, and Elephant, or Elephant, Horse, and Camel, but keeping the same moves.
In early chess the moves of the pieces were:

Two Arab travelers each recorded a severe Indian chess rule against stalemate:
A stalemated player thereby at once wins.
A stalemated king can take one of the enemy pieces that would check the king if the king moves.

Iran (Persia) 

The Karnamak-i Ardeshir-i Papakan, a Pahlavi epical treatise about the founder of the Sassanid Persian Empire, mentions the game of chatrang as one of the accomplishments of the legendary hero, Ardashir I, founder of the Empire. The oldest recorded game in chess history is a 10th-century game played between a historian from Baghdad and a pupil.

A manuscript explaining the rules of the game called "Matikan-i-chatrang" (the book of chess) in Middle Persian or Pahlavi still exists.
In the 11th-century Shahnameh, Ferdowsi describes a Raja visiting from India who re-enacts the past battles on the chessboard. A translation in English, based on the manuscripts in the British Museum, is given below:

One day an ambassador from the king of Hind arrived at the Persian court of Chosroes, and after an oriental exchange of courtesies, the ambassador produced rich presents from his sovereign and amongst them was an elaborate board with curiously carved pieces of ebony and ivory. He then issued a challenge:
"Oh great king, fetch your wise men and let them solve the mysteries of this game. If they succeed my master the king of Hind will pay tribute as an overlord, but if they fail it will be proof that the Persians are of lower intellect and we shall demand tribute from Iran."
The courtiers were shown the board, and after a day and a night in deep thought one of them, Bozorgmehr, solved the mystery and was richly rewarded by his delighted sovereign.

The Shahnameh goes on to offer an apocryphal account of the origins of the game of chess in the story of Talhand and Gav, two half-brothers who vie for the throne of Hind (India). They meet in battle and Talhand dies on his elephant without a wound. Believing that Gav had killed Talhand, their mother is distraught. Gav tells his mother that Talhand did not die by the hands of him or his men, but she does not understand how this could be. So the sages of the court invent the game of chess, detailing the pieces and how they move, to show the mother of the princes how the battle unfolded and how Talhand died of fatigue when surrounded by his enemies. The poem uses the Persian term "Shāh māt" (check mate) to describe the fate of Talhand.

The philosopher and theologian Al-Ghazali mentions chess in The Alchemy of Happiness (c. 1100). He uses it as a specific example of a habit that may cloud a person's good disposition:

The appearance of the chess pieces had altered greatly since the times of chaturanga, with ornate pieces and chess pieces depicting animals giving way to abstract shapes. This is because of a Muslim ban on the game's lifelike pieces, as they were said to have been too like idols. The Islamic sets of later centuries followed a pattern which assigned names and abstract shapes to the chess pieces, as Islam forbids depiction of animals and human beings in art. These pieces were usually made of simple clay and carved stone.

East Asia

China
As a strategy board game played in China, chess is believed to have been derived from the Indian chaturanga. Chaturanga was transformed into the game xiangqi where the pieces are placed on the intersection of the lines of the board rather than within the squares. The object of the Chinese variation is similar to chaturanga, i.e. to render helpless the opponent's king, known as "general" on one side and "governor" on the other. Chinese chess also borrows elements from the game of Go, which was played in China since at least the 6th century BC. Owing to the influence of Go, Chinese chess is played on the intersections of the lines on the board, rather than in the squares. The game of Xianqi is also unique in that the middle rank represents a river, and is not divided into squares. Chinese chess pieces are usually flat and resemble those used in checkers, with pieces differentiated by writing their names on the flat surface.

An alternative origin theory contends that chess arose from xiangqi or a predecessor thereof, existing in China since the 3rd century BC. David H. Li, a translator of ancient Chinese texts, hypothesizes that general Han Xin drew on the earlier game of Liubo to develop an early form of Chinese chess in the winter of 204–203 BC. The German chess historian Peter Banaschak, however, points out that Li's main hypothesis "is based on virtually nothing." He notes that the "Xuanguai lu", authored by the Tang Dynasty minister Niu Sengru (779–847), remains the first real source on the Chinese chess variant xiangqi.

Japan 

A prominent variant of chess in East Asia is the game of shogi, transmitted from India to China and Korea before finally reaching Japan. The three distinguishing features of shogi are:
 The captured pieces may be reused by the captor and played as a part of the captor's forces.
 Pawns capture as they move, one square straight ahead.
 The board is 9×9, with a second gold general on the other side of the king.

Drops were not originally part of shogi. In the 13th century, shogi underwent an expansion, creating the game of dai shogi, played on a 15×15 board with many new pieces, including the independently invented rook, bishop and queen of modern Western chess, the drunk elephant that promotes to a second king, and also the even more powerful lion, which among other idiosyncrasies has the power to move or capture twice per turn. Around the 14th or 15th centuries, the popularity of dai shogi then waned in favour of the smaller chu shogi, played on a smaller 12×12 board which removed the weakest pieces from dai shogi, similarly to the development of Courier chess in the West. In the meantime, the original 9×9 shogi, now termed sho shogi, continued to be played, but was regarded as less prestigious than chu shogi and dai shogi. Chu shogi was very popular in Japan, and the rook, bishop, and drunk elephant from it were added to sho shogi, where the first two remain today.

In the 15th and 16th centuries, yet more shogi variants were described, on large boards and with many more pieces. The 1694 book Shōgi Zushiki details tenjiku shogi (16×16), dai dai shogi (17×17), maka dai dai shogi (19×19), and tai shogi (25×25); it also mentions wa shogi (11×11), ko shogi (19×19), and taikyoku shogi (36×36). It is not thought that these games were played very much.

Chu shogi declined in popularity after the addition of drops to sho shogi and the removal of the drunk elephant in the 16th century, becoming moribund around the late 20th century. These changes to sho shogi created what is essentially the modern game of shogi.

Thailand

The Thai variant of chess, makruk is a close living relative to chaturanga, retaining the vizier, non-checkered board, limited promotion, offset kings, and elephant-like bishop move.

Mongolia 
Chess is recorded from Mongolian-inhabited areas, where the pieces are now called:
 King: Noyon – Ноён – lord
 Queen: Bers / Nohoi – Бэрс / Нохой – dog (to guard the livestock)
 Bishop: Temē – Тэмээ – camel
 Knight: Morĭ – Морь – horse
 Rook: Tereg – Тэрэг – cart
 Pawn: Hū – Хүү – boy (the piece often showed a puppy)

Names recorded from the 1880s by Russian sources, quoted in Murray, among the Soyot people (who at the time spoke the Soyot Turkic language) include: merzé (dog), täbä (camel), ot (horse), ōl (child) and Mongolian names for the other pieces. This game is called shatar; a large 10×10 variant called hiashatar was also played.

The change with the queen is likely due to the Arabic word firzān or Persian word farzīn (= "vizier") being confused with Turkic or Mongolian native words (merzé = "mastiff", bar or bars = "tiger", arslan = "lion").

Western chess is now the prevalent form of the game in Mongolia.

East Siberia 
Chess was also recorded from the Yakuts, Tunguses, and Yukaghirs; but only as a children's game among the Chukchi. Chessmen have been collected from the Yakutat people in Alaska, having no resemblance to European chessmen, and thus likely part of a chess tradition coming from Siberia.

Arab world 

Chess passed from Persia to the Arab world, where its name changed to Arabic shatranj. From there it passed to Western Europe, probably via Spain.

Over the centuries, features of European chess (e.g. the modern moves of queen and bishop, and castling) found their way via trade into Islamic areas. Murray's sources found the old moves of queen and bishop still current in Ethiopia. The game became so popular it was used in writing at that time, played by nobility and regular people. The poet al-Katib once said, "The skilled player places his pieces in such a way as to discover consequences that the ignorant man never sees... thus, he serves the Sultan's interests, by showing how to foresee disaster."

Russia 
Chess has 1000 years of history in Russia. Chess was probably brought to Old Russia in 9th century via the Volga-Caspian trade route. From the 10th century cultural connections with the Byzantine Empire and the Vikings also influenced the history of chess in Russia. The vocabulary in Russian chess has various foreign-language elements and testifies to different influences in the evolution of chess in Russia. Chess is mentioned in folk poems as a popular game and is documented in the Old Russian byliny. Numerous archeological finds of the chess game have already been found in the regions of Old Russia. From 1262 on chess was called in Russia shakhmaty. Various foreign travellers commented that in the 16th century, chess was popular among all classes in Russia. Ivan IV the Terrible, who ruled Russia from 1530 to 1584, is said to have died while playing chess. In 1791 the popular chess book Morals of Chess by Benjamin Franklin was translated into Russian and published in the country. Chess enjoys a very high status in Russia and was gradually introduced as a school subject in all primary schools since 2017.

Europe

Early history 

Shatranj made its way via the expanding Islamic Arabian empire to Europe. It also spread to the Byzantine empire, where it was called . Chess appeared in Southern Europe during the end of the first millennium, often introduced to new lands by conquering armies, such as the Norman Conquest of England. Previously little known, chess became popular in Northern Europe when figure pieces were introduced.

In the 14th century, Timur played an enlarged variation of the game which is commonly referred to as Tamerlane chess. This complex game involved each pawn having a particular purpose, as well as additional pieces.

The sides are conventionally called White and Black. But, in earlier European chess writings, the sides were often called Red and Black because those were the commonly available colours of ink when handwriting drawing a chess game layout. In such layouts, each piece was represented by its name, often abbreviated (e.g. "ch'r" for French "chevalier" = "knight").

The social value attached to the game – seen as a prestigious pastime associated with nobility and high culture – is clear from the expensive and exquisitely made chessboards of the medieval era. The popularity of chess in the Western courtly society peaked between the 12th and the 15th centuries. The game found mention in the vernacular and Latin language literature throughout Europe, and many works were written on or about chess between the 12th and the 15th centuries. H. J. R. Murray divides the works into three distinct parts: the didactic works e.g. Alexander of Neckham's De scaccis (c. 1180); works of morality like Liber de moribus hominum et officiis nobilium sive super ludo scacchorum (Book of the customs of men and the duties of nobles or the Book of Chess), written by Jacobus de Cessolis; and the works related to various chess problems, written largely after 1205. Chess terms, like check, were used by authors as a metaphor for various situations.
Chess was soon incorporated into the knightly style of life in Europe. Peter Alfonsi, in his work Disciplina Clericalis, listed chess among the seven skills that a good knight must acquire. Chess also became a subject of art during this period, with caskets and pendants decorated in various chess forms. Queen Margaret of England had green and red chess sets made of jasper and crystal. Kings Henry I, Henry II and Richard I of England were chess patrons. King Alfonso X of Castile and Tsar Ivan IV of Russia gained a similar status.

Saint Peter Damian denounced the bishop of Florence in 1061 for playing chess even when aware of its evil effects on the society. The bishop of Florence defended himself by declaring that chess involved skill and was therefore "unlike other games," and similar arguments followed in the coming centuries. Two incidents in 13th-century London, in which men of Essex resorted to violence resulting in death as an outcome of playing chess, caused further sensation and alarm. The growing popularity of the game – now associated with revelry and violence – alarmed the Church.

The practice of playing chess for money became so widespread during the 13th century that Louis IX of France issued an ordinance against gambling in 1254. This ordinance turned out to be unenforceable and was largely neglected by the common public, and even the courtly society, which continued to enjoy the now-prohibited chess tournaments uninterrupted.

Shapes of pieces

The pieces, which had been nonrepresentational in Islamic countries (see piece values in shantranj), changed shape in Christian cultures. Carved images of men and animals reappeared. The shape of the rook, originally a rectangular block with a V-shaped cut in the top, changed; the two top parts separated by the split tended to get long and hang over, and in some old pictures look like horses' heads. The split top of the piece now called the bishop was interpreted as a bishop's mitre or a fool's cap.

By the mid-12th century, the pieces of the chess set were depicted as kings, queens, bishops, knights and men at arms. Chessmen made of ivory began to appear in North-West Europe, and ornate pieces of traditional knight warriors were used as early as the mid 13th century. The initially nondescript pawn had now found association with the pedes, pedinus, or the footman, which symbolized both infantry and loyal domestic service.

Names of pieces
The following table provides a glimpse of the changes in names and character of chess pieces as they crossed from India through Persia to Europe:

The game, as played during the early Middle Ages, was slow, with many games lasting days. Some variations in rules began to change the shape of the game by the year 1300. A notable, but initially unpopular, change was the ability of the pawn to move two places in the first move instead of one.

In Europe some of the pieces gradually received new names:
 Fers: "queen", because it starts beside the king.
 Aufin: "bishop", because its two points looked like a bishop's mitre. Its Latin name  was reinterpreted many ways.

Early changes to the rules

Attempts to make the start of the game run faster to get the opposing pieces in contact sooner included:
 Pawn moving two squares in its first move. This led to the en passant rule: a pawn placed so that it could have captured the enemy pawn if it had moved one square forward was allowed to capture it on the passed square. In Italy, the contrary rule (passar battaglia = "to pass battle") applied: a pawn that moved two squares forward had passed the danger of attack on the intermediate square. It was sometimes not allowed to do this to cover check.
 King jumping once, to make it quicker to put the king safe in a corner. (This eventually led to castling.)
 Queen on its first move moving two squares straight or diagonally to a same-coloured square, with jump. (This rule sometimes also applied to a queen made by promoting a pawn.)
 The short assize. ("assize" = "sitting") Here the pawns started on the third rank; the queens started on d3 and d6 along with the queens' pawns; the players arranged their other pieces as they wished behind their pawns at the start of the game. This idea did not endure.

Other sporadic variations in the rules of chess included:
 Ignoring check from a piece which was covering check, as some said that in theory (in the diagram on the right), Bxe7 would allow Rxc8 in reply.

Introduction of new rules

The queen and bishop remained relatively weak until between 1475 AD and 1500 AD, in Spain (in the Kingdom of Valencia), the queen's and bishop's modern moves started and spread, making chess close to its modern form. The first document showing the Queen (or Dama) moving this way is the allegorical poem Scachs d'amor, written in Catalan in Valencia in 1475. This form of chess got such names as "Queen's Chess" or "Mad Queen Chess" (Italian alla rabiosa = "with the madwoman"). This led to much more value being attached to the previously minor tactic of pawn promotion. Checkmate became easier and games could now be won in fewer moves. These new rules quickly spread in Spain and throughout the rest of Western Europe, with the exception of the rules about stalemate, which were finalized in the early 19th century. The modern move of the queen may have started as an extension of its older ability to once move two squares with jump, diagonally or straight. Marilyn Yalom says that the new move of the queen started in Spain: see history of the queen.

In some areas (e.g. Russia), the queen could also move like a knight.

A poem Caïssa published in 1527 led to the chess rook being often renamed as "castle", and the modern shape of the rook chess piece; see Vida's poem for more information.

An Italian player, Gioacchino Greco, regarded as one of the first true professionals of the game, authored an analysis of a number of composed games that illustrated two differing approaches to chess. His work was influential in popularizing chess, and demonstrated many theories regarding game play and tactics.

The first full work dealing with the various winning combinations was written by François-André Danican Philidor of France, regarded as the best chess player in the world for nearly 50 years, and published in the 18th century. He wrote and published L'Analyse des échecs (The Analysis of Chess), an influential work which appeared in more than 100 editions.

Writings on the theory of how to play chess began to appear in the 15th century. The oldest surviving printed chess book, Repetición de Amores y Arte de Ajedrez (Repetition of Love and the Art of Playing Chess) by Spanish churchman Luis Ramirez de Lucena was published in Salamanca in 1497. Lucena and later masters like Portuguese Pedro Damiano, Italians Giovanni Leonardo Di Bona, Giulio Cesare Polerio and Gioachino Greco or Spanish bishop Ruy López de Segura developed elements of openings and started to analyze simple endgames.
In the 18th century the center of European chess life moved from the Southern European countries to France. The two most important French masters were François-André Danican Philidor, a musician by profession, who discovered the importance of pawns for chess strategy, and later Louis-Charles Mahé de La Bourdonnais who won a famous series of matches with the Irish master Alexander McDonnell in 1834. Centers of chess life in this period were coffee houses in big European cities like Café de la Régence in Paris and Simpson's Divan in London.

As the 19th century progressed, chess organization developed quickly. Many chess clubs, chess books and chess journals appeared. There were correspondence matches between cities; for example the London Chess Club played against the Edinburgh Chess Club in 1824. Chess problems became a regular part of 19th-century newspapers; Bernhard Horwitz, Josef Kling and Samuel Loyd composed some of the most influential problems. In 1843, von der Lasa published his and Bilguer's Handbuch des Schachspiels (Handbook of Chess), the first comprehensive manual of chess theory.

Modern competitive chess 
Competitive chess became visible in 1834 with the La Bourdonnais-McDonnell matches, and the 1851 London Chess tournament raised concerns about the time taken by the players to deliberate their moves. On recording time it was found that players often took hours to analyze moves, and one player took as much as two hours and 20 minutes to think over a single move at the London tournament. The following years saw the development of speed chess, five-minute chess and the most popular variant, a version allowing a bank of time to each player in which to play a previously agreed number of moves, e.g. two hours for 30 moves. In the final variant, the player who made the predetermined number of moves in the agreed time received additional time budget for his next moves. Penalties for exceeding a time limit came in form of fines and forfeiture. Since fines were easy to bear for professional players, forfeiture became the only effective penalty; this added "lost on time" to the traditional means of losing such as checkmate and resigning.

In 1861 the first time limits, using sandglasses, were employed in a tournament match at Bristol, England. The sandglasses were later replaced by pendulums. Modern clocks, consisting of two parallel timers with a small button for a player to press after completing a move, were later employed to aid the players. A tiny latch called a flag further helped settle arguments over players exceeding time limit at the turn of the 19th century.

A Russian composer, Vladimir Korolkov, authored a work entitled "Excelsior" in 1958 in which the White side wins only by making six consecutive captures by a pawn. Position analysis became particularly popular in the 19th century. Many leading players were also accomplished analysts, including Max Euwe, Mikhail Botvinnik, Vasily Smyslov and Jan Timman. Digital clocks appeared in the 1980s.

Another problem that arose in competitive chess was when adjourning a game for a meal break or overnight. The player who moved last before adjournment would be at a disadvantage, as the other player would have a long period to analyze before having to make a reply when the game was resumed. Preventing access to a chess set to work out moves during the adjournment would not stop him from analyzing the position in his head. Various strange ideas were attempted, but the eventual solution was the "sealed move". The final move before adjournment is not made on the board but instead is written on a piece of paper which the referee seals in an envelope and keeps safe. When the game is continued after adjournment, the referee makes the sealed move and the players resume.

Birth of a sport (1850–1945) 

The first modern chess tournament was held in London in 1851 and won, surprisingly, by German Adolf Anderssen, who was relatively unknown at the time. Anderssen was hailed as the leading chess master, and his brilliant, energetic attacking style became typical for the time, although it was retrospectively regarded as strategically shallow. Sparkling games like Anderssen's Immortal game and Evergreen Game or Morphy's Opera game were regarded as the highest possible summit of the chess art.

Deeper insight into the nature of chess came with two younger players. American Paul Morphy, an extraordinary chess prodigy, won against all important competitors, including Anderssen, during his short chess career between 1857 and 1863. Morphy's success stemmed from a combination of brilliant attacks and sound strategy; he intuitively knew how to prepare attacks. Prague-born Wilhelm Steinitz later described how to avoid weaknesses in one's own position and how to create and exploit such weaknesses in the opponent's position. In addition to his theoretical achievements, Steinitz founded an important tradition: his triumph over the leading Polish-German master Johannes Zukertort in 1886 is regarded as the first official World Chess Championship. Steinitz lost his crown in 1894 to a much younger German mathematician Emanuel Lasker, who maintained this title for 27 years, the longest tenure of all World Champions.

It took a prodigy from Cuba, José Raúl Capablanca (World champion 1921–27), who loved simple positions and endgames, to end the German-speaking dominance in chess; he was undefeated in tournament play for eight years until 1924. His successor was Russian-French Alexander Alekhine, a strong attacking player, who died as the World champion in 1946, having briefly lost the title to Dutch player Max Euwe in 1935, regaining it two years later.

Between the world wars, chess was revolutionized by the new theoretical school of so-called hypermodernists like Aron Nimzowitsch and Richard Réti. They advocated controlling the center of the board with distant pieces rather than with pawns, inviting opponents to occupy the center with pawns which become objects of attack.

Since the end of 19th century, the number of annually held master tournaments and matches quickly grew. Some sources state that in 1914 the title of chess grandmaster was first formally conferred by Tsar Nicholas II of Russia to Lasker, Capablanca, Alekhine, Tarrasch and Marshall, but this is a disputed claim. The tradition of awarding such titles was continued by the World Chess Federation (FIDE), founded in 1924 in Paris. In 1927, Women's World Chess Championship was established; the first to hold it was Czech-English master Vera Menchik.

During World War II, many prominent chess players died or were killed, including: Isaak Appel, Zoltan Balla, Sergey Belavenets, Henryk Friedman, Achilles Frydman, Eduard Gerstenfeld, Alexander Ilyin-Genevsky, Mikhail Kogan, Jakub Kolski, Leon Kremer, Arvid Kubbel, Leonid Kubbel, Salo Landau, Moishe Lowtzky, Vera Menchik, Vladimir Petrov, David Przepiorka, Ilya Rabinovich, Vsevolod Rauzer, Nikolai Riumin, Endre Steiner, Mark Stolberg, Abram Szpiro, Karel Treybal, Alexey Troitzky, Samuil Vainshtein, Heinrich Wolf, and Lazar Zalkind.

Post-war era (1945 and later) 

After the death of Alekhine, a new World Champion was sought in a tournament of elite players ruled by FIDE, who have controlled the title since then, with a sole interruption. The winner of the 1948 tournament, Russian Mikhail Botvinnik, ushered in an era of Soviet dominance in the chess world. Until the end of the Soviet Union, there was only one non-Soviet champion, American Bobby Fischer (champion 1972–75).

In the previous informal system, the World Champion decided which challenger he would play for the title and the challenger was forced to seek sponsors for the match. FIDE set up a new system of qualifying tournaments and matches. The world's strongest players were seeded into "Interzonal tournaments", where they were joined by players who had qualified from "Zonal tournaments". The leading finishers in these Interzonals would go on the "Candidates" stage, which was initially a tournament, later a series of knock-out matches. The winner of the Candidates would then play the reigning champion for the title. A champion defeated in a match had a right to play a rematch a year later. This system worked on a three-year cycle.

Botvinnik participated in championship matches over a period of fifteen years. He won the world championship tournament in 1948 and retained the title in tied matches in 1951 and 1954. In 1957, he lost to Vasily Smyslov, but regained the title in a rematch in 1958. In 1960, he lost the title to the Latvian prodigy Mikhail Tal, an accomplished tactician and attacking player. Botvinnik again regained the title in a rematch in 1961.

Following the 1961 event, FIDE abolished the automatic right of a deposed champion to a rematch, and the next champion, Armenian Tigran Petrosian, a genius of defense and strong positional player, was able to hold the title for two cycles, 1963–69. His successor, Boris Spassky from Russia (1969–72), was a player able to win in both positional and sharp tactical style.

The next championship saw the first non-Soviet challenger since World War II, Bobby Fischer, who defeated his Candidates opponents by unheard-of margins and won the world championship match. In 1975, however, Fischer refused to defend his title against Soviet Anatoly Karpov when FIDE refused to meet his demands, and Karpov obtained the title by default. Karpov defended his title twice against Viktor Korchnoi and dominated the 1970s and early 1980s with a string of tournament successes.

Karpov's reign finally ended in 1985 at the hands of another Russian player, Garry Kasparov. Kasparov and Karpov contested five world title matches between 1984 and 1990; Karpov never won his title back.

In 1993, Garry Kasparov and Nigel Short cut ties with FIDE to organize their own match for the title and formed a competing Professional Chess Association (PCA). From then until 2006, there were two simultaneous World Champions and World Championships: the PCA or Classical champion extending the Steinitzian tradition in which the current champion plays a challenger in a series of many games; the other following FIDE's new format of many players competing in a tournament to determine the champion. Kasparov lost his Classical title in 2000 to Vladimir Kramnik of Russia.

Earlier in 1999, Kasparov as the reigning world champion played a game online against the world team composed of more than 50,000 participants from more than 75 countries. The moves of the world team were decided by plurality vote, and after 62 moves played over four months Kasparov won the game.

The FIDE World Chess Championship 2006 reunified the titles, when Kramnik beat the FIDE World Champion Veselin Topalov and became the undisputed World Chess Champion. In September 2007, Viswanathan Anand from India became the next champion by winning a championship tournament. In October 2008, Anand retained his title, decisively winning the rematch against Kramnik. Anand retained his title until 2013, when he lost it to Magnus Carlsen from Norway, the current World Chess Champion. Carlsen defended his title four times. However, he declined to defend his title in the 2023 championship, and thus will relinquish it to the winner of that match.

Rule changes

Stalemate was originally considered an inferior form of victory; at various times it has been considered a win, a draw, or even a loss for the player delivering it. Since the 18th century, it has been considered a draw.

The convention that White moves first was established in the 19th century; previously either White or Black could move first.

Castling rules have varied, variations persisting in Italy until the late 19th century.

Rules concerning draws by repetition and the fifty-move rule have been refined and now require a formal claim. Perpetual check is no longer included in the rules of chess.

There have been no recent changes to the moves of the pieces, but the wording of some rules has been changed for the purposes of clarity.

The London 1883 chess tournament introduced chess clocks, creating a new rule for loss on time.

In line with the rule against receiving outside assistance, if a player's mobile phone or other electronic device generates sound, the player is immediately forfeited. In amateur tournaments players are asked to hand their phones to the tournament director; in professional tournaments they may be required to go through a metal detector.

See also 
 
 Chess in the arts
 Computer chess
 History of chess engines
 List of chess historians
 List of chess variants
 List of games that Buddha would not play
 School of chess
 Timeline of chess
 Wheat and chessboard problem

Notes

References 

Encyclopædia Britannica

 
 
 
 
 
 
 
 
 

WWW

 

Books

 
 Bird, Henry Edward (1893). Chess History and Reminiscences. London. (Republished version by Forgotten Books). .
 
 
 
 Forbes, Duncan (1860). The History of Chess: From the Time of the Early Invention of the Game in India Till the Period of Its Establishment in Western and Central Europe. London: W. H. Allen & Co.
 
 
 
 
  Reprint: (1996) 
 
 
 
 
 
 
 Leibs, Andrew (2004). Sports and Games of the Renaissance. Connecticut: Greenwood Publishing Group. 
 
 
 
 Musser Golladay, Sonja, "Los Libros de acedrex dados e tablas: Historical, Artistic and Metaphysical Dimensions of Alfonso X's Book of Games" (PhD diss., University of Arizona, 2007)
 
 
 
  Saidy, Anthony. The battle of chess ideas (Batsford, 1972); scholarly history; The March of Chess Ideas: How the Century's Greatest Players Have Waged the War Over Chess Strategy  (1994)
 
 
 
 
 

Journals

 Anand, Viswanathan, "The Indian Defense", TIME, Thursday, Jun. 19, 2008. An article on the history of chess by the 2007-10 chess world champion.
 
  (PDF version)

External links 
 Origin and history of Chess, Xiangqi, Shogi and more
 Initiative group Koenigstein
 Goddess Chess Chessays
 Chess for all ages
Alfonso X y el ajedrez - Alfonso X and Chess